Hi-Jinks is a hidden camera show that aired on Nick at Nite from August 2, 2005 to October 31, 2006. In the show, hosted by Leila Sbitani, parents are given a chance to play practical jokes on their children, in a similar fashion to Candid Camera. Taking a cue from Punk'd, each episode features a prank that is conducted with the assistance of a known celebrity.

Episodes

Series overview

Season 1 (2005)

Season 2 (2006)

Special (2006)

References

External links 
 

2000s American comedy television series
2000s American reality television series
2005 American television series debuts
2006 American television series endings
English-language television shows
American hidden camera television series
Nick at Nite original programming